Low frequency (LF) is the ITU designation for radio frequencies (RF) in the range of 30–300 kHz. Since its wavelengths range from 10–1 km, respectively, it is also known as the kilometre band or kilometre wave.

LF radio waves exhibit low signal attenuation, making them suitable for long-distance communications. In Europe and areas of Northern Africa and Asia, part of the LF spectrum is used for AM broadcasting as the "longwave" band. In the western hemisphere, its main use is for aircraft beacon, navigation (LORAN), information, and weather systems. A number of time signal broadcasts also use this band.

Propagation

Because of their long wavelength, low frequency radio waves can diffract over obstacles like mountain ranges and travel beyond the horizon, following the contour of the Earth. This mode of propagation, called ground wave, is the main mode in the LF band. Ground waves must be vertically polarized (the electric field is vertical while the magnetic field is horizontal), so vertical monopole antennas are used for transmitting. The attenuation of signal strength with distance by absorption in the ground is lower than at higher frequencies.

Low frequency waves can also occasionally travel long distances by reflecting from the ionosphere (the actual mechanism is one of refraction), although this method, called skywave or "skip" propagation, is not as common as at higher frequencies. Reflection occurs at the ionospheric E layer or F layers. Skywave signals can be detected at distances exceeding  from the transmitting antenna.

Uses

Radio broadcasting

AM broadcasting is authorized in the longwave band on frequencies between 148.5 and 283.5 kHz in Europe and parts of Asia.

Standard time signals

In Europe and Japan, many low-cost consumer devices have since the late 1980s contained radio clocks with an LF receiver for these signals. Since these frequencies propagate by ground wave only, the precision of time signals is not affected by varying propagation paths between the transmitter, the ionosphere, and the receiver. In the United States, such devices became feasible for the mass market only after the output power of WWVB was increased in 1997 and 1999.

Military

Radio signals below 50 kHz are capable of penetrating ocean depths to approximately 200 metres, the longer the wavelength, the deeper. The British, German, Indian, Russian, Swedish, United States and possibly other navies communicate with submarines on these frequencies.

In addition, Royal Navy nuclear submarines carrying ballistic missiles are allegedly under standing orders to monitor the BBC Radio 4 transmission on 198 kHz in waters near the UK. It is rumoured that they are to construe a sudden halt in transmission, particularly of the morning news programme Today, as an indicator that the UK is under attack, whereafter their sealed orders take effect.

The United States has four LF stations maintaining contact with its submarine force: Aguada, Puerto Rico, Keflavik, Iceland, Awase, Okinawa, and Sigonella, Italy, using AN/FRT-95 solid state transmitters.

In the U.S., the Ground Wave Emergency Network or GWEN operated between 150 and 175 kHz, until replaced by satellite communications systems in 1999. GWEN was a land based military radio communications system which could survive and continue to operate even in the case of a nuclear attack.

Experimental and amateur
The 2007 World Radiocommunication Conference (WRC-07) made a worldwide amateur radio allocation in this band. An international 2.1 kHz allocation, the 2200 meter band (135.7 kHz to 137.8 kHz), is available to amateur radio operators in several countries in Europe, New Zealand, Canada, USA, and French overseas dependencies.

The world record distance for a two-way contact is over 10,000 km from near Vladivostok to New Zealand. As well as conventional Morse code many operators use very slow computer-controlled Morse code (QRSS) or specialized digital communications modes.

The UK allocated a 2.8 kHz sliver of spectrum from 71.6 kHz to 74.4 kHz beginning in April 1996 to UK amateurs who applied for a Notice of Variation to use the band on a noninterference basis with a maximum output power of 1 Watt ERP. This was withdrawn on 30 June 2003 after a number of extensions in favor of the European-harmonized 136 kHz band.

In the United States, there is an exemption within FCC Part 15 regulations permitting unlicensed transmissions in the frequency range of 160 to 190 kHz. Longwave radio hobbyists refer to this as the 'LowFER' band, and experimenters, and their transmitters are called 'LowFERs'. This frequency range between 160 kHz and 190 kHz is also referred to as the 1750-meter band. Requirements from 47CFR15.217 and 47CFR15.206 include:
 The total input power to the final radio frequency stage (exclusive of filament or heater power) shall not exceed one watt.
 The total length of the transmission line, antenna, and ground lead (if used) shall not exceed 15 meters.
 All emissions below 160 kHz or above 190 kHz shall be attenuated at least 20 dB below the level of the unmodulated carrier.
 As an alternative to these requirements, a field strength of 2400/F(kHz) microvolts/meter (measured at a distance of 300 meters) may be used (as described in 47CFR15.209).
 In all cases, operation may not cause harmful interference to licensed services.
Many experimenters in this band are amateur radio operators.

Meteorological information broadcasts

A regular service transmitting RTTY marine meteorological information in SYNOP code on LF is the German Meteorological Service (Deutscher Wetterdienst or DWD). The DWD operates station DDH47 on 147.3 kHz using standard ITA-2 alphabet with a transmission speed of 50 baud and FSK modulation with 85 Hz shift.

Radio navigation signals

In parts of the world where there is no longwave broadcasting service, Non-directional beacons used for aeronavigation operate on 190–300 kHz (and beyond into the MW band). In Europe, Asia and Africa, the NDB allocation starts on 283.5 kHz.

The LORAN-C radio navigation system operated on 100 kHz.

In the past, the Decca Navigator System operated between 70 kHz and 129 kHz. The last Decca chains were closed down in 2000.

Differential GPS telemetry transmitters operate between 283.5 and 325 kHz.

The commercial "Datatrak" radio navigation system operates on a number of frequencies, varying by country, between 120 and 148 kHz.

Other applications
Some radio frequency identification (RFID) tags utilize LF. These tags are commonly known as LFIDs or LowFIDs (Low Frequency Identification). The LF RFID tags are near field devices.

Antennas

Since the ground waves used in this band require vertical polarization, vertical antennas are used for transmission. Mast radiators are most common, either insulated from the ground and fed at the bottom, or occasionally fed through guy-wires. T-antennas and inverted L-antennas are used when antenna height is an issue. Due to the long wavelengths in the band, nearly all LF antennas are electrically short, shorter than one quarter of the radiated wavelength, so their low radiation resistance makes them inefficient, requiring very low resistance grounds and conductors to avoid dissipating transmitter power. These electrically short antennas need loading coils at the base of the antenna to bring them into resonance. Many antenna types, such as the umbrella antenna and L- and T-antenna, use capacitive top-loading (a "top hat"), in the form of a network of horizontal wires attached to the top of the vertical radiator. The capacitance improves the efficiency of the antenna by increasing the current, without increasing its height.

The height of antennas differ by usage. For some non-directional beacons (NDBs) the height can be as low as 10 meters, while for more powerful navigation transmitters such as DECCA, masts with a height around 100 meters are used. T-antennas have a height between 50 and 200 meters, while mast aerials are usually taller than 150 meters.

The height of mast antennas for LORAN-C is around 190 meters for transmitters with radiated power below 500 kW, and around 400 meters for transmitters greater than 1,000 kilowatts. The main type of LORAN-C antenna is insulated from ground.

LF (longwave) broadcasting stations use mast antennas with heights of more than 150 meters or T-aerials. The mast antennas can be ground-fed insulated masts or upper-fed grounded masts. It is also possible to use cage antennas on grounded masts.

For broadcasting stations, directional antennas are often required. They consist of multiple masts, which often have the same height. Some longwave antennas consist of multiple mast antennas arranged in a circle with or without a mast antenna in the center. Such antennas focus the transmitted power toward ground and give a large zone of fade-free reception. This type of antenna is rarely used, because they are very expensive and require much space and because fading occurs on longwave much more rarely than in the medium wave range. One antenna of this kind was used by transmitter Orlunda in Sweden.

For reception, long wire antennas are used, or more often ferrite loop antennas because of their small size. Amateur radio operators have achieved good LF reception using active antennas with a short whip.

LF transmitting antennas for high power transmitters require large amounts of space, and have been the cause of controversy in Europe and the United States due to concerns about possible health hazards associated with human exposure to radio waves.

See also
Longwave
LowFER
2200-meter band
Time signal
Ground Wave Emergency Network (GWEN)
WGU-20

Passive RFID

References

Further reading 
 Tomislav Stimac, "Definition of frequency bands (VLF, ELF... etc.)".
 IK1QFK Home Page.
 
 
 

Radio spectrum